Edward Lazare Shorter  (born October 31, 1941) is an American-born Canadian historian who is Professor & Hannah Chair in the History of Medicine in the Faculty of Medicine at the University of Toronto. His specializations are in the history of medicine and psychiatry. He is a fellow of the Royal Society of Canada.

See also 
 symptom pool - a collection of symptoms that people exhibit and which signal their distress to others

References

External links
 

Faculty page

Living people
1941 births
American emigrants to Canada
20th-century Canadian historians
21st-century Canadian historians
Wabash College alumni
Harvard University alumni
Academic staff of the University of Toronto
Fellows of the Royal Society of Canada
Medical historians